In 2018, the American House/Remix duo Dirty Werk released an electro dance version of "Stand Up", the song is largely a cover of Love Tribe's 1996 hit "Stand Up". The song became their first number one on Billboard's Dance Club Songs chart, reaching the summit in its September 22, 2018 issue.

Track listing

Charts

Weekly charts

Year-end charts

References

2018 songs